Anthidium utahense is a species of bee in the family Megachilidae, the leaf-cutter, carder, or mason bees.

Synonyms
Synonyms for this species include:
Anthidium sagittipictum Swenk, 1914
Anthidium divisum Cockerell, 1925
Anthidium divisum nanulum Cockerell, 1925
Anthidium divisum ornatifrons Cockerell, 1925
Anthidium brachyurum Cockerell, 1925

References

External links
Anatomical illustrations and photos

utahense
Insects described in 1914